Richard Burton (10 November 1925 – 5 August 1984) was a Welsh actor who had an extensive career primarily on stage and in film. He was known for his powerful presence and mellifluous baritone voice.

Theatre

Filmography

Television

Selected radio broadcasts

Discography

References

Bibliography

External links 
 Richard Burton Complete Filmography at TCM Movie Database

Male actor filmographies
British filmographies